Columbia Town Center may refer to:

Town Center, Columbia, Maryland
The Mall in Columbia in Columbia, Maryland